Julie Garwood (born 1944 in Kansas City, Missouri) is an American writer of over twenty-seven romance novels in both the historical and suspense subgenres.  Over thirty-five million copies of her books are in print, and she has had at least 24 New York Times Bestsellers. She has also written a novel for young adults called A Girl Named Summer.

Garwood's novel For the Roses was adapted for the television feature Rose Hill.

Biography
Julie Garwood was raised in Kansas City, Missouri, the sixth of seven children in a large Irish family. She has five sisters: Sharon, Kathleen, Marilyn, Mary Colette "Cookie", and Joanne, and one brother: Tom. After having a tonsillectomy at age six, because she missed so much school, she did not learn to read as the other children her age did.  She was eleven before her mother realized Garwood was unable to read.  A math teacher, Sister Elizabeth, devoted the entire summer that year to teaching Garwood how to read, and how to enjoy the stories she was reading.  This teacher had such an impact on Garwood's life that she named her daughter Elizabeth.

While studying to be an R.N., Garwood took a Russian history course and became intrigued by history, choosing to pursue a double major in history and nursing.  A professor, impressed by the quality of her essays, convinced Garwood to write.  The result was a children's book, A Girl Named Summer, and her first historical novel, Gentle Warrior.

She married young and had three children: Gerry, Bryan, and Elizabeth. The family resides in Leawood, Kansas. Although Garwood enjoyed her writing, she was not intending to pursue a career as an author.  As a young wife and mother she took several freelance writing jobs, and wrote longer stories to amuse herself.  After her youngest child started school, Garwood began attending local writers' conferences, where she soon met an agent.  The agent sold both her children's book and her historical novel, and soon the publisher requested more historical romances.

Garwood's novels are particularly known for the quirkiness of her heroines, who tend to have an ability to get lost anywhere, clumsiness, and a "charming ability to obfuscate and change the direction of conversations to the consternation, frustration, but eventual acceptance of the other party." She is not afraid to tackle difficult issues, and one of her books deals with spousal abuse.

Despite her success in the historical romance genre, Garwood ventured into a new genre and began writing contemporary romantic suspense novels.  Like her historicals, these contemporaries still focus on family relationships, whether between blood relatives or groups of friends who have styled themselves as a family.

Her first contemporary offering, Heartbreaker, was optioned for film and was serialized in Cosmopolitan magazine.

Bibliography

As Emily Chase

The Girls of Canby Hall series

14.What's a Girl to Do?	1985

(Under the pseudonym Emily Chase, Julie Garwood wrote one Young Adult novel).

As Julie Garwood

Young Adult
A Girl Named Summer 03/1986

Single Novels
Gentle Warrior (Elizabeth Montwright - Geoffrey Berkley) 10/1985
Rebellious Desire (Caroline Richmond - Jered Marcus Benton) 06/1986
Honor's Splendour (Madelyne - Baron Duncan) 12/1987
The Prize	08/1991
Saving Grace	12/1993
Prince Charming	06/1994

Crown's Spies Series
The Lion's Lady	12/1988
Guardian Angel	05/1990
The Gift	01/1991
Castles	07/1993

Lairds' Brides Series
The Bride	07/1989
The Wedding	04/1996

Highlands' Lairds Series
The Secret	05/1992
Ransom 09/1999
Shadow Music 12/2007

Clayborne of Rosehill Series
For The Roses	02/1995
One Pink Rose	06/1997 (and in "The Clayborne Brides")
One White Rose	07/1997 (and in "The Clayborne Brides")
One Red Rose	08/1997 (and in "The Clayborne Brides")
Come The Spring	12/1997

Buchanan/FBI Series
Heartbreaker  08/2000 (Nick Buchanan/Laurant Madden)
Mercy  09/2001 (Theo Buchanan/Dr. Michelle Renard)
Killjoy  09/2002 (John Paul Renard/Avery Delaney)
Murder List 08/2004 (Alec Buchanan/Regan Hamilton Madison)
Slow Burn  08/2005 (Dylan Buchanan/Kate MacKenna)
Shadow Dance  12/2006 (Noah Clayborne/Jordan Buchanan)
Fire and Ice  12/2008 (Jack MacAlister/Sophie Summerfield Rose)
Sizzle  12/2009 (Samuel Kincaid/Lyra Prescott)
The Ideal Man  08/2011 (Max Daniels/Dr. Ellie Sullivan)
Sweet Talk  08/2012 (Grayson Kincaid/Olivia Mackenzie)
Hotshot 06/2013 (Finn MacBain/Peyton Lockhart)
Fast Track 02/2014 (Aiden Madison/Cordelia Kane)
Wired 05/2017 (Liam Scott/Alison Trent
Grace Under Fire 07/2022 (Michael Buchanan/ Grace Isabel MacKenna)

References

External links
 Official Site
 

20th-century American novelists
21st-century American novelists
American thriller writers
American romantic fiction writers
1946 births
Living people
RITA Award winners
Writers from Kansas City, Missouri
People from Leawood, Kansas
Novelists from Kansas
American people of Irish descent
American women novelists
Women thriller writers
Women romantic fiction writers
Novelists from Missouri
American historical fiction writers
20th-century American women writers
21st-century American women writers